Aechmea entringeri is a species of flowering plant in the genus Aechmea. This species is endemic to the State of Espírito Santo in eastern Brazil.

References

entringeri
Endemic flora of Brazil
Plants described in 1987